Charmander, known as  in Japan, is a Pokémon species in Nintendo's and Game Freak's Pokémon franchise. Created by Atsuko Nishida, Charmander first appeared in the video games Pokémon Red and Blue and subsequent sequels, later appearing in various merchandise, spinoff titles, and various movies, animated and printed adaptations of the franchise. The end of a Charmander's tail is alight with a flame, and the flame's size reflects both the physical health and the emotions of the individual. It is known as the Lizard Pokemon.

Charmander is one of three 'starter' Pokémon that can be selected at the beginning of Pokémon Red and Blue, and their remakes, Pokémon FireRed and LeafGreen. In the anime, Ash acquires a Charmander early in the series, and it became one of his most used Pokémon. In the Pokémon Adventures manga, Blue receives a Charmander from his grandfather Professor Oak. Since it appeared in the Pokémon series, Charmander has received generally positive reception. Charmander first appeared in episode 11 of Pokémon Indigo League ("Charmander – The Stray Pokémon" (The Stray Pokémon – Hitokage)). In the episode, Charmander is left by its owner, Damian, and is rescued by Ash and Brock. When Damian sees how powerful Charmander is, he calls Charmander back. However, because of Damian's abuse, Charmander chooses to follow the group that saved its life, and becomes Ash's Pokémon. In the series, the narrator stated that if a Charmander's tail flame goes out, it dies. Charmander is used by Ash throughout his adventures and is seen in special episodes in the future.

Charmander evolves into Charmeleon at level 16, who then evolves into Charizard at level 36, which was originally its last form. Since the release of Pokémon X and Y, Charizard can mega evolve into 2 different types of Mega Charizard, which are Mega Charizard X or Mega Charizard Y, for the duration of a battle. This gives it temporary upgraded stats and a major damage bonus. Charmander was one of the Pokémon that survived the National Pokédex cuts introduced in Pokémon Sword and Shield in 2019.

Design and characteristics
Charmander was designed as a fire Pokémon for the first generation of Pocket Monsters games Red and Green (which were localized outside Japan as Pokémon Red and Blue) by Atsuko Nishida, who based its design on Charizard in such a way that it was difficult to tell it would have evolved into the latter Pokémon. Originally called "Hitokage" in Japanese, Nintendo decided to give the various Pokémon species "clever and descriptive names" related to their appearance or features when translating the game for western audiences as a means to make the characters more relatable to American children. As a result, the species was renamed "Charmander", a portmanteau of "char", meaning burnt, and "salamander".

Charmander are small, bipedal lizard-like Pokémon native to Kanto. They have blue eyes, orange skin, three-toed clawed feet, yellow bellies, and a single yellow pad covering most of the soles of their feet. While the Pokémon Red and Green sprites made by Atsuko Nishida featured only three fingers on each hand, like Charmeleon and Charizard, the artwork drawn by Ken Sugimori for those games depicted Charmander as having an additional thumb on each hand. Since Pokémon Black and White, a new updated artwork was released in which Charmander has just three fingers on each hand. Said updated design has since been used consistently in the anime, including the movies and specials like Pokémon Origins, as well as in official artwork used in merchandise and in plushies, dolls and figurines, accompanying the artwork by Ken Sugimori as well as the 3D CG models and the artwork derived from those that still feature the four-fingered hand. Noticeably, the Charmander artwork made by Nishida for the Trading Card Game in 2018 showed Charmander as having just three fingers on each hand.

The end of a Charmander's tail is alight with a flame, and the flame's size reflects both the physical health and the emotions of the individual. When it rains, steam is said to spout from the tip of its tail. If the flame were to ever go out, the Charmander would die. When Charmander receives enough experience from battles, it evolves into Charmeleon (at level 16 in the video games), and later Charizard. With the help of the Mega Stone, it can further Mega Evolve into Mega Charizard X/Mega Charizard Y. The idea to feature Charmander and the other Red and Blue starters in a significant role in Pokémon X and Y came about a year and a half into the development of the games. The Mega Evolutions for the three Pokémon's final forms were created, and the designers decided that they should give players an opportunity to find one of these Pokémon in order to see their Mega Evolved form.

Appearances

In the video games

Charmander is a starter Pokémon the player can choose from at the beginning of Pokémon Red and Blue, and their remakes, Pokémon FireRed and LeafGreen. Charmander and the other starters from Red and Blue are replaced by Pikachu in Pokémon Yellow, the only starter available in it. Instead, they are each obtained from certain NPCs. In Pokémon HeartGold and SoulSilver, as a reward from Professor Oak after defeating the final boss, Red, the player can choose from Bulbasaur, Charmander, and Squirtle. In Pokémon X and Y, players can also choose between Bulbasaur, Charmander, and Squirtle near the start of the game shortly after having chosen the games' new starter Pokémon. It also appeared in Pokémon Omega Ruby and Alpha Sapphire, Pokémon: Let's Go, Pikachu! and Let's Go, Eevee! and Pokémon Sword and Shield. Outside of the main series, Charmander has appeared in Pokémon Go, Hey You, Pikachu!, Pokémon Snap, Pokémon Puzzle League, the Pokémon Mystery Dungeon games, the Pokémon Ranger games, Pokemon: Detective Pikachu, PokéPark Wii: Pikachu's Adventure, Pokémon UNITE, New Pokémon Snap, and other Pokémon games. A Pokémon stage in Super Smash Bros. called "Saffron City" features an area where various Pokémon pop out to try to attack players; one such Pokémon is a Charmander that sometimes uses Flamethrower.

In anime
In anime, Ash acquires a Charmander early in the series. Ash's Charmander originally belonged to a trainer named Damian, who believed it was weak and cruelly abandoned it, telling it to stay on a rocky outcrop until he "returned." The Pokémon was very loyal to its trainer and risked its life sitting in the rain, waiting for a trainer who'd never come back to it. Ash, Brock, and Misty had to rush it to a Pokémon Center to keep it alive. Upon seeing Damian's true colors, Charmander joined Ash. It was immediately one of Ash's most used Pokémon, defeating such opponents as Koga's Golbat, Erika's Weepinbell, and helped capture Ash's Primeape. Charmander evolved into Charmeleon after a battle against an army of Exeggutor. His personality changed drastically, disobeying Ash and fighting only when and how he pleased.

In an anime adaption of Pokémon Mystery Dungeon: Blue Rescue Team and Red Rescue Team, a Charmander and a female Chikorita work alongside a young boy who transformed into a Squirtle in helping fellow Pokémon.

In Pokémon the Movie: I Choose You! Charmander's behavior and personality are different compared to what was seen in the anime. In it, Charmander, when evolved into Charmeleon, leaps into Ash's arms for a hug and subsequently he recognizes Ash's authority, even when battling his former trainer, Cross. When he evolves into a Charizard, near the end of the film, he stays obedient to Ash and even saves Cross from the attacks of his Lycanroc.

In other media
In the Electric Tale of Pikachu manga, the circumstances in which Ash captures a Charmander appear to be different. While Damian appears, he was separated from his Charmander because he was injured, not because he abandoned it. At the end of the chapter, the two reunite. Despite this difference, Ash is still seen owning a Charmander, whose capture is not shown. Later in the manga, Ash's Charmander reappears as a Charizard.

In the Pokémon Adventures manga, Blue receives a Charmander from his grandfather Professor Oak. The blue team tried using it against Mew but failed and withdrew his Pokémon. It is later shown to have evolved into a Charmeleon. then a Charizard. Later, in the Gold, Silver & Crystal chapter, Blue team decides to trade his Charizard with Red team for a Gyarados. Nearing the end of the chapter, the Charizard is returned to him for a big battle. In the Pokémon Pocket Monsters manga series, Isamu Akai's rival Kai Midorikawa, chose Charmander as his starter Pokémon. Kai's Charmander is mischievous and has a rivalry with Isamu Akai's Clefairy.

In the online phenomenon known as Twitch Plays Pokémon, the stream chose Charmander as Red's starter and named it "ABBBBBBK(", or "Abby" as it was commonly referred to. Abby was vital in defeating Brock and obtaining the Boulder Badge. Along its journey to Cerulean City, Abby evolved into a Charmeleon in the depths of Mt. Moon, securing it as Red's early-game muscle. Abby continued to prove itself by helping Red obtain the Cascade, Thunder, and Rainbow Badges. Unfortunately, during an unfortunate visit Saffron City's Pokemon Center, Abby was released into the wild and NEVER seen again.

Charmander appeared in the background of the movie Detective Pikachu.

Reception
Since it appeared in the Pokémon series, Charmander has received generally positive reception. It has appeared in several pieces of merchandise, including figures, plush toys, and the Pokémon Trading Card Game. It has been noted as a popular Halloween costume for the year of 1999. Also in 1999, it was speculated by analysts that Pokémon species, in particular Charmander and others, would become sought-after toys.

IGN readers ranked Charmander at #37 among the best Pokémon ever. Game Informers O'Dell Harmon ranked Charmander - along with Bulbasaur and Squirtle - as the "third best" Pokémon. He noted that the choice between the three was "one of the most important decisions to ever be made in Pokémon history." Lyra Hale of The Mary Sue claimed that "it got absolutely wild when Charmander was a healthy dinosaur." GamesTM noted that Charmander was the "worst starting Pokémon" in Red and Blue. In the book Dragonlore: From the Archives of the Grey School of Wizardry, author Ash Dekirk described Charmander as a "fire-breathing dragon". Author Loredana Lipperini cited Charmander as a "popular Pokémon", suggesting that its popularity comes from its fiery tail. Author Mark Jacobson found the transition from Charmander to Charizard to be "odd", questioning how a "baby" Pokémon can grow into a "two-hundred-pound monster whose breath can melt boulders." GamesRadar+ commented that while Charmander seems "pitiful" due to its flame tail, which "burn more brightly depending on his mood/health", it grows into the "cool-looking Charizard". GamesRadar editor Brett Elston stated that while it "lacks the nuances" of later similar starting Pokémon, it has "cutesy appeal" to it. The Escapist editor John Funk described Charmander as "cute", using its evolution into Charizard as an example of "an extreme evolutionary change" in the series. Chicago Tribune editor Darryl E. Owens described Charmander as "adorable". San Antonio-Express News editor Susan Yerkes described Charmander as "disgustingly cute". Teen Ink editor Kathryn J. called Charmander her "favorite Pokémon". Allegra Frank of Polygon said that Charmander is the best Pokémon of all time. Michael Derosa of Screen Rant ranked Charmander as ninth of the most iconic Pokémon from Generation I. Sam Loveridge of Digital Spy claimed that Charmander is one of the best Pokémon starters, and further stated that not only is Charmander an adorable starter Pokémon, he's also ridiculously powerful. 

Charmander was among eleven Pokémon chosen as Japan's mascots in the 2014 FIFA World Cup.

References

External links

Charmander on Bulbapedia
Charmander on IMDb
Charmander on Pokemon.com

Fictional lizards
Pokémon species
Dragon characters in video games
Fictional dragons
Fictional reptilians
Video game characters introduced in 1996
Video game characters with fire or heat abilities